Gemmulopsis nigellensis is an extinct species of sea snails, marine gastropod mollusks in the family Turridae.

Distribution
Fossils of this extinct species were found in late Lutetian Eocene strata of the Cotentin, northwest France.

References

 Tracey S., Craig B. & Gain O. (2019). Turridae (Gastropoda, Conoidea) from the late Lutetian Eocene of the Cotentin, NW France: endemism through loss of planktotrophy?. Carnets de Voyages Paléontologiques dans le Bassin Anglo-Parisien. 5: 101–140.

Turridae
Prehistoric gastropods
Molluscs of Europe